Big Horn is a tall peak in the Cascade Range in the U.S. state of Washington. This officially unnamed peak is the highest point in Lewis County. Big Horn, one of the Goat Rocks, is the second highest point on the ridge west of Gilbert Peak, in the Goat Rocks Wilderness.  It is just west of the highest point on the ridge, called Goat Citadel.  It is said to be the most difficult pitch on the easiest routes of Washington's 39 county high points. There is a  vertical crack near Big Horn's summit. Fred Beckey rates this pitch as a difficult .

References

External links 
 
 

Mountains of Lewis County, Washington
Mountains of Washington (state)
Mountains of Yakima County, Washington
Gifford Pinchot National Forest